Toptal is a global remote company that provides a freelancing platform, connecting businesses with software engineers, designers, finance experts, product managers, and project managers. The company has no headquarters.

History 
Taso Du Val and Breanden Beneschott founded the company in 2010. Du Val was previously an engineer at Fotolog and Slide.com while Beneschott was an undergraduate at  Princeton University. The name stands for "top talent", and it was started as a virtual company with no dedicated offices.

Toptal had more than $1 million in revenue by the time Beneschott graduated from Princeton. The co-founders moved to Budapest, Hungary to access software developers with fewer employment options than in the United States.

Talent search and growth 
The firm developed personality, language, and skills testing to remotely screen engineering candidates, and accepted the top 3% of several thousand monthly applicants.

The firm matches business engagements with developers from its  network and brokers the terms of each job. In 2015, it expanded to include freelance design. In 2016, it acquired the freelancer platform, Skillbridge, which offered freelance accountants, statisticians, and consultants in market research, financial modeling, and due diligence. In 2017, the company launched a vertical specializing in software engineers and designers for the automotive industry. It also launched a vertical for blockchain engineers in February 2018.

Funding 
Toptal accepted a $1.4 million seed round of financing from Andreessen Horowitz and angel investors including Quora founder Adam D'Angelo. The company is said not to have raised additional funds since its seed round because it has been profitable. In 2015 and 2016, Toptal's annual revenue was $80 million and $100 million respectively.

See also 
 Remotebase.com
Freelancer.com
Upwork
 Guru.com
 Fiverr
 PeoplePerHour
 Behance

References

External links

Remote companies
Online marketplaces of the United States
Online employment auction websites
Freelance marketplace websites
Employment websites